Mihails Miholaps (born 24 August 1974) is a Latvian Russian professional football coach and a former player.

A former striker, he played 32 international matches and scored two goals for the Latvia national team. He debuted in 1998, and also played at the Euro 2004.

Miholaps started his career in Vest Kaliningrad, and played for Baltika Kaliningrad, Daugava Riga, Spartak-Alania Vladikavkaz, Skonto Riga, FC Shakhter, FK Riga and Olimps/RFS.

Playing career

* - played games and goals

Honours
Latvian Higher League top goalscorer: 1996, 2001, 2002, 2006
CIS Cup top goalscorer: 1999

External links
 Latvian Football Federation 
 

1974 births
Living people
Sportspeople from Kaliningrad
Latvian footballers
Association football forwards
Latvia international footballers
Skonto FC players
Latvian Higher League players
FC Spartak Vladikavkaz players
UEFA Euro 2004 players
FC Baltika Kaliningrad players
FC Shakhter Karagandy players
Russian Premier League players
Kazakhstan Premier League players
Latvian people of Russian descent
JFK Olimps players
JFK Olimps managers
FK Rīga players
Latvian football managers
Latvian expatriate footballers
Latvian expatriate sportspeople in Russia
Expatriate footballers in Russia
Expatriate footballers in Kazakhstan